Garneh (also known as Karnaj, and Karneh) is a village in Ijrud-e Pain Rural District, Halab District, Ijrud County, Zanjan Province, Iran. At the time of the 2006 census, its population was consisting of 71 people in 21 families. Currently, the population is 77.

References 

Populated places in Ijrud County